Danila Viktorovich Alistratov (born October 30, 1990) is a Russian ice hockey goaltender. He has played for Traktor Chelyabinsk and is currently on a try-out contract with the Manchester Monarchs of the ECHL

Career statistics

Regular season

Playoffs

International

External links
 

1990 births
Living people
Russian ice hockey goaltenders
Sportspeople from Chelyabinsk
Traktor Chelyabinsk players
Universiade medalists in ice hockey
Universiade bronze medalists for Russia
Competitors at the 2013 Winter Universiade